Niederwindhagen is a locality in the municipality Windhagen in the district of Neuwied in Rhineland-Palatinate, Germany.

Villages in Rhineland-Palatinate